Juan Rieckehoff (born 20 May 1953) is a Puerto Rican equestrian. He competed in the individual jumping event at the 1976 Summer Olympics.

References

External links
 

1953 births
Living people
Puerto Rican male equestrians
Olympic equestrians of Puerto Rico
Equestrians at the 1976 Summer Olympics
Place of birth missing (living people)